"My My, Hey Hey (Out of the Blue)" is a song by Canadian musician Neil Young. An acoustic song, it was recorded live in early 1978 at the Boarding House in San Francisco, California. Combined with its hard rock counterpart "Hey Hey, My My (Into the Black)", it bookends Young's 1979 album Rust Never Sleeps. Inspired by electropunk group Devo, the rise of punk and what Young viewed as his own growing irrelevance, the song significantly revitalized Young's career.

The line, "it's better to burn out than to fade away" was taken from one of the songs of Young's bandmate in the short-lived supergroup The Ducks, Jeff Blackburn. The line was also used in the movie Highlander (1986), in the church scene where the Kurgan (Clancy Brown) and the Highlander (Christopher Lambert) meet. The Kurgan utters the line as he exits the church. It became infamous after being quoted in Nirvana frontman Kurt Cobain's suicide note. Young later said that he was so shaken that he dedicated his 1994 album Sleeps with Angels to Cobain.

Legacy 
Young compared the rise of Johnny Rotten with that of the recently deceased "King" Elvis Presley, who himself had once been disparaged as a dangerous influence only to later become an icon. In 1977, Rotten responded by playing a song by Young on a radio program.

The song may best be known for the line "It's better to burn out than to fade away" (actually only spoken in full in the acoustic "My My, Hey Hey" and the Human Highway film recording ). Kurt Cobain's suicide note ended with the same line, shaking Young and inadvertently cementing his place as the so-called "Godfather of Grunge".

Ex-Beatle John Lennon commented on the message of the song in a 1980 interview with David Sheff from Playboy:

Young would reply two years later when asked to respond to Lennon's comments:

The rock'n'roll spirit is not survival. Of course the people who play rock'n'roll should survive. But the essence of the rock'n'roll spirit to me, is that it's better to burn out really bright than to sort of decay off into infinity. Even though if you look at it in a mature way, you'll think, "well, yes… you should decay off into infinity, and keep going along". Rock'n'roll doesn't look that far ahead. Rock'n'roll is right now. What's happening right this second. Is it bright? Or is it dim because it's waiting for tomorrow—that's what people want to know. And that's why I say that.

Oasis covered the song on their 2000 world tour, including it on their live album and DVD Familiar to Millions. The band acknowledged Cobain's attachment to the song by dedicating it to him when they played it in Seattle on the sixth anniversary of his death.

It is included on Neil Young's Greatest Hits album.

The song is the title theme of Dennis Hopper's movie Out of the Blue.

The song was included at number 93 in Bob Mersereau's book The Top 100 Canadian Singles (2010).

A cover by Battleme appeared on season 3, episode 13 of Sons of Anarchy.

References

External links 
 HyperRust Never Sleeps - a Neil Young database with information and further lyrics
 Kurt Cobain and Neil Young - details the connection between Nirvana and Young, as well as Cobain's suicide note
 Sonic Youth and Neil Young - details Sonic Youth's involvement with Young during the early 1990s
 Ruth Israel, Rachel Auger and Patrick McAllister - Theatrical Blues Performance dedicated to Neil Young

1979 singles
Songs written by Neil Young
Songs about suicide
Reprise Records singles
Neil Young songs
1979 songs
Song recordings produced by David Briggs (record producer)
Song recordings produced by Neil Young